The following outline is provided as an overview of and topical guide to Montserrat:

Montserrat – British overseas territory located in the Leeward Islands of the Lesser Antilles archipelago in the Caribbean Sea. The island was given its name by Christopher Columbus on his second voyage to the New World in 1493, after its namesake located in Catalonia. Montserrat is often referred to as the Emerald Isle of the Caribbean, due both to its resemblance to coastal Ireland and to the Irish descent of most of its early European settlers.

Its Georgian era capital city of Plymouth was destroyed and two-thirds of the island's population forced to flee abroad by an eruption of the previously dormant Soufriere Hills volcano that began on July 18, 1995. The eruption continues today on a much reduced scale, the damage being confined to the areas around Plymouth including its docking facilities and the former W.H. Bramble Airport. An exclusion zone extending from the south coast of the island north to parts of the Belham Valley has been closed because of an increase in the size of the existing volcanic dome. This zone includes St. George's Hill which provided visitors with a view of the volcano and the destruction it has wrought upon the capital. A new airport at Gerald's in the northern part of the island opened in 2005. The village of Brades currently serves as the de facto centre of government.

General reference 

 Pronunciation:
 Common English country name:  Montserrat
 Official English country name:  The British Overseas Territory of Montserrat
 Common endonym(s):  
 Official endonym(s):  
 Adjectival(s): Montserratian
 Demonym(s):
 Etymology: Name of Montserrat
 ISO country codes:  MS, MSR, 500
 ISO region codes:  See ISO 3166-2:MS
 Internet country code top-level domain:  .ms

Geography of Montserrat 

Geography of Montserrat
 Montserrat is: an island, and a British overseas territory
 Location:
 Northern Hemisphere and Western Hemisphere
 North America (though not on the mainland)
 Atlantic Ocean
 North Atlantic
 Caribbean
 Antilles
 Lesser Antilles
 Leeward Islands
 Time zone:  Eastern Caribbean Time (UTC-04)
 Extreme points of Montserrat
 High:  Chances Peak in the Soufriere Hills volcanic complex 
 Low:  Caribbean Sea 0 m
 Land boundaries:  none
 Coastline:  Caribbean Sea 40 km
 Population of Montserrat: 5,900  - 216th most populous country

 Area of Montserrat: 102 km2
 Atlas of Montserrat

Environment of Montserrat 

 Climate of Montserrat
 Renewable energy in Montserrat
 Geology of Montserrat
 Protected areas of Montserrat
 Biosphere reserves in Montserrat
 National parks of Montserrat
 Wildlife of Montserrat
 Fauna of Montserrat
 Birds of Montserrat
 Mammals of Montserrat

Natural geographic features of Montserrat 

 Fjords of Montserrat
 Glaciers of Montserrat
 Islands of Montserrat
 Lakes of Montserrat
 Mountains of Montserrat
 Volcanoes in Montserrat
 Rivers of Montserrat
 Waterfalls of Montserrat
 Valleys of Montserrat
 World Heritage Sites in Montserrat: None
'''* world Heritage Sites in Monsterrat

Regions of Montserrat 

Regions of Montserrat

Ecoregions of Montserrat 

List of ecoregions in Montserrat
 Ecoregions in Montserrat

Administrative divisions of Montserrat 

Administrative divisions of Montserrat
 Parishes of Montserrat

Parishes of Montserrat 

Parishes of Montserrat

Municipalities of Montserrat 

 Capital of Montserrat: Brades
 Cities of Montserrat

Demography of Montserrat 

Demographics of Montserrat

Government and politics of Montserrat 

Politics of Montserrat
 Form of government: parliamentary representative democratic dependency
 Capital of Montserrat: Brades
 Elections in Montserrat
 Political parties in Montserrat

Branches of the government of Montserrat 

Government of Montserrat

Executive branch of the government of Montserrat 
 Head of state: Monarch of the United Kingdom, King Charles III
 Monarch's representative: Governor of Montserrat,
 Head of government: Chief Minister of Montserrat,
 Cabinet of Montserrat

Legislative branch of the government of Montserrat 

 Parliament of Montserrat (bicameral)
 Upper house: Senate of Montserrat
 Lower house: House of Commons of Montserrat

Judicial branch of the government of Montserrat 

Court system of Montserrat
 Supreme Court of Montserrat

Foreign relations of Montserrat 

Foreign relations of Montserrat
 Diplomatic missions in Montserrat
 Diplomatic missions of Montserrat
 Montserrat-United Kingdom relations

International organization membership 
Montserrat is a member of:
Caribbean Community and Common Market (Caricom)
Caribbean Development Bank (CDB)
International Criminal Police Organization (Interpol) (subbureau)
Organization of Eastern Caribbean States (OECS)
Universal Postal Union (UPU)
World Federation of Trade Unions (WFTU)

Law and order in Montserrat 

Law of Montserrat
 Constitution of Montserrat
 Crime in Montserrat
 Human rights in Montserrat
 LGBT rights in Montserrat
 Freedom of religion in Montserrat
 Law enforcement in Montserrat

Military of Montserrat 

Military of Montserrat
 Command
 Commander-in-chief:
 Ministry of Defence of Montserrat
 Forces
 Army of Montserrat
 Navy of Montserrat
 Air Force of Montserrat
 Special forces of Montserrat
 Military history of Montserrat
 Military ranks of Montserrat

Local government in Montserrat 

Local government in Montserrat

History of Montserrat 

History of Montserrat
Timeline of the history of Montserrat
Current events of Montserrat
 Military history of Montserrat

Culture of Montserrat 

Culture of Montserrat
 Architecture of Montserrat
 Cuisine of Montserrat
 Festivals in Montserrat
 Languages of Montserrat
 Media in Montserrat
 National symbols of Montserrat
 Coat of arms of Montserrat
 Flag of Montserrat
 National anthem of Montserrat
 People of Montserrat
 Public holidays in Montserrat
 Records of Montserrat
 Religion in Montserrat
 Christianity in Montserrat
 Hinduism in Montserrat
 Islam in Montserrat
 Judaism in Montserrat
 Sikhism in Montserrat
 World Heritage Sites in Montserrat: None

Art in Montserrat 
 Art in Montserrat
 Cinema of Montserrat
 Literature of Montserrat
 Music of Montserrat
 Television in Montserrat
 Theatre in Montserrat

Sports in Montserrat 

Sports in Montserrat
 Football in Montserrat
 Montserrat at the Olympics

Economy and infrastructure of Montserrat 

Economy of Montserrat
 Economic rank, by nominal GDP (2007): 189th (one hundred and eighty ninth)
 Agriculture in Montserrat
 Banking in Montserrat
 National Bank of Montserrat
 Communications in Montserrat
 Internet in Montserrat
 Companies of Montserrat
Currency of Montserrat: Dollar
ISO 4217: XCD
 Energy in Montserrat
 Energy policy of Montserrat
 Oil industry in Montserrat
 Mining in Montserrat
 Tourism in Montserrat
 Transport in Montserrat
 Montserrat Stock Exchange

Education in Montserrat 

Education in Montserrat

Infrastructure of Montserrat 
 Health care in Montserrat
 Transportation in Montserrat
 Airports in Montserrat
 Rail transport in Montserrat
 Roads in Montserrat
 Water supply and sanitation in Montserrat

See also 

Montserrat
Index of Montserrat-related articles
List of international rankings
List of Montserrat-related topics
Outline of geography
Outline of North America
Outline of the Caribbean
Outline of the United Kingdom

References

External links 

Government of Montserrat
Montserrat Hospitality Association
Montserrat Reporter news site
Montserrat Tourist Board

Montserrat Travel Information
Montserrat Volcano Observatory
Montserrat Webdirectory
Official release archive
Radio Montserrat—ZJB Listen live online
Satellite image of Montserrat from Google Maps
Volcanism of Montserrat
Scuba Diving in Montserrat

.
Montserrat